Joseph (von) Heine (28 November 1803 – 4 November 1877) was a German physician and a high civil servant in the Bavarian health service in the Rheinkreis.

Medical career in Franconia and in the Palatinate

Joseph Heine was born in Würzburg on 28 November 1803. He was the son of Johann Georg Heine, who was an orthopedist and manufacturer of orthopedic instruments for the Würzburg university. Joseph attended the Würzburg Gymnasium until 1824 and studied medicine in Würzburg and Munich. In 1827 he passed his state examination in Bamberg and did his doctorate as an MD in Würzburg.

Heine widened his medical knowledge by a number of journeys abroad. In the winter of 1828/29 he studied dermatology and surgery in Paris. His tutor in the latter discipline was Guillaume Dupuytren.

The departure of his father Johann Georg Heine to the Netherlands in 1828 forced the son to return to Würzburg, where—together with his cousin Bernhard—he took over the management of the Karolinen-Institut for one year.

In 1830 a "desire for further education" compelled him to travel to Vienna and Warsaw, where in 1831 he treated persons wounded in the anti-Russian rebellion as well as persons suffering from cholera.

As he came down with typhoid fever himself he had to return to Bavaria and worked as a physician in Homburg on the Main and in Würzburg, before he applied for the post of  district doctor in Waldmohr in the Palatinate. When he was appointed in 1836 he gained the rank of a royal civil servant in the Kingdom of Bavaria, which he held for lifetime. In 1840 he applied for the higher post of a "first-class district doctor" in Germersheim, which he held until 1851.

"Political" Interlude (1848–1851)

In 1848 Heine stood for a seat in the Frankfurt National Assembly, but lost by a very narrow margin. Although he characterized himself as "unpolitical" his political leaning could be described as "pan-German and anti-revolutionary".

His second effort to gain a political mandate was successful:  He was elected a member of the second chamber of the Bavarian Landtag. Yet in 1851 he gave up the seat, returned to Franconia and became a forensic pathologist and hospital manager in the city of Bamberg.

Government official in the Palatinate (1856–1875)

Heine's next upward  step in his career was the appointment as "Kreis- und Medizinalrat der Pfalz", a position which put him in charge of overseeing the health system of this administrative region. His office was in Speyer from where he did an excellent job supervising physicians, hospitals and pharmacies all over the region until his retirement in 1875.

Although he did not have a surgery of his own, he treated friends and relatives, and also poor people in his neighbourhood. He had good contacts to German physicians, e. g. Rudolf Virchow in Würzburg, which may have been the reason for the facht that the 36th congress of German physicians and scientists in the summer of 1861 was held in Speyer.

Joseph Heine and his father

When Johann Georg Heine left Würzburg and his family in 1829 to settle in the Netherlands it must have been shocking for his son Joseph. When Johann Georg wanted him to take over a hospital in Brussels he rejected the offer and rather completed his medical education in other European cities. He was greatly concerned when he learned about his father's efforts in branches of medicine he was not qualified for. There was only one meeting of father and son in 1838, shortly before the father's death. Johann Georg was already very sick and Joseph wanted to help him. However, he had to realize that his father stubbornly insisted on curing himself with dubious methods. In a publication four years later, Joseph Heine harshly criticized his father for leaving his family and for trying unscholarly methods of medical treatment, but also praised his merits as an outstanding orthopedist.

Joseph Heine and Anselm Feuerbach

Besides numerous friendships with prominent contemporaries, such as the Bavarian minister Theodor von Zwehl (1800–1875), publisher Johann Friedrich Cotta and philosopher and historian Peter Ernst von Lasaulx Heine had a particularly close connection with  the Feuerbach family.
Heine had known and admired Karl Wilhelm Feuerbach, the mathematician, since his student years. After Karl's death Heine was good friends with the elder brother Joseph Anselm Feuerbach, who taught archeology in Freiburg. Joseph Heine soon recognized the artistic talent of his friend's son Anselm Feuerbach and tried to encourage and support him. His and von Zwehl's attempt to send the young painter to Wilhelm von Kaulbach in Munich was a failure: in 1850 Feuerbach went to Antwerp instead.

On his way through, Anselm visited Heine in Germersheim, to "get money for the journey out of him", but, in a letter to his mother, had to admit later: "Heine was sullen, and I had to say farewell, politely, at once, I am very sick and tired of him."

This meant the end of the relationship—at least according to available sources. Anselm Feuerbach went to Paris and Rome to become a famous painter. Joseph Heine lost sight of him.

On his retirement in 1875, Joseph Heine received a personal peerage of the Bavarian Kingdom, which made him Joseph von Heine. He lived for two more years in Munich and died there on 4 November 1877.

Bibliography 
Hekler, Hans: Joseph Heine  – Mediziner, Politiker und Kunstmäzenin D'Kräz (Beiträge zur Geschichte der Stadt und Raumschaft Schramberg) Heft 13, Schramberg 1993 (also online, see external links)
Hansen, Heinz: Die Orthopädenfamilie Heine - Leben und Wirken der einzelnen Familienmitglieder im Zeichen einer bedeutenden deutschen Familientradition des neunzehnten Jahrhunderts, doctoral thesis, Dresden 1993

External links 
 The article is a translation of the German article, which in turn is a short summary of  this biography with illustrations

Notes

Politicians from Würzburg
Physicians from Würzburg
People from the Kingdom of Bavaria
Members of the Bavarian Chamber of Deputies
1803 births
1877 deaths
German healthcare managers